This is a list of New Zealand television personalities, including presenters and journalists. It includes those who left the profession, retired, or died.

A
 Suzy Aiken – television personality and Prime News presenter
 Peter Arnett – television journalist, Pulitzer Prize winner
 Astar – television arts and crafts presenter
 Aunt Daisy – radio personality

B
 Petra Bagust – television presenter
 Judy Bailey – television news presenter
 Simon Barnett – radio and television personality, NewsTalk ZB Afternoon Host
 Hilary Barry – journalist, radio and television presenter
 Maggie Barry – radio host, television presenter, politician
 Alison Bell – television journalist and former anchorwoman
 Kevin Black – radio host
 Dominic Bowden – television personality and host
 Ben Boyce – television and radio personality
 Greg Boyed – television news and current affairs presenter
 Keith Bracey – television presenter and journalist
 Sarah Bradley – television presenter
 Pat Brittenden – talkback host
 Clint Brown – television sports presenter
 Jaquie Brown – television presenter, actress and radio presenter
 Shaun Brown – reporter, presenter and producer and television executive
 Geoff Bryan – reporter, presenter
 Michelle Buchanan– numerologist

C
 Cathy Campbell – sports and news presenter
 John Campbell – television reporter and current affairs host
 Tina Carline – weather presenter and continuity announcer
 Sharyn Casey – radio and television host, actress
 Suzy Cato – children's entertainer and television host
 Wallace Chapman – radio and television host
 Matt Chisholm – former host of Celebrity Treasure Island, Survivor NZ, Sunday, Fair Go, and Seven Sharp
 Rawdon Christie – journalist, news presenter and host
 John Clarke – Satirical comedian, writer and actor. Creator of Fred Dagg
 Suzy Clarkson – television host and presenter
 Lana Coc-Kroft – radio and television host, beauty queen
 Jenny-May Coffin – netball player, sports commentator and news presenter
 James Coleman – television presenter, radio host and actor
 Neil Collins – broadcaster and local body politician
 Daniel Corbett – weather presenter
 Jeremy Corbett - television presenter
 Pam Corkery – journalist, broadcaster, and former politician
 Joe Cotton – television and radio personality
 Max Cryer – presenter, singer, writer and academic
 Dave Cull – television presenter, writer and politician

D
 Angela D'Audney - television and radio news presenter
 Simon Dallow – journalist, news presenter and barrister
 Tania Dalton – international netball player and netball commentator
 Murray Deaker – radio and television sports reporter
 Joel Defries – television presenter (British born)
 Martin Devlin – radio and television broadcaster
 Hamish Dodd - television and radio presenter
 Oliver Driver – actor, director, broadcaster and television presenter

E
 Brian Edwards – media personality and author
 Janika ter Ellen – television news anchor
 Marc Ellis – television personality, former All Black
 Guyon Espiner – print and television journalist and presenter
 Alma Evans-Freke – television personality, actor, producer, teacher

F
 Andrew Fagan – radio broadcaster and musician
 Daniel Faitaua – television host
 Joan Faulkner-Blake – broadcaster
 Jay-Jay Feeney – radio broadcaster
 Carly Flynn – radio and television reporter and presenter
 Mihingarangi Forbes – television presenter, journalist and radio broadcaster
 Derek Fox – broadcaster, commentator, publisher, journalist and candidate
 Ian Fraser – broadcaster and television executive

G
 Iain Gallaway – radio sports commentator
 Duncan Garner – radio and television host and political journalist
 Roger Gascoigne – radio and television presenter
 Alan Gaskell – television newsreader and radio sports commentator
 Clarke Gayford – television presenter
 Matthew Gibb – television presenter
 Jo Giles – television presenter and former representative sportswoman
 Polly Gillespie – radio host
 Amanda Gillies – political reporter
 Ewen Gilmour – comedian and television presenter
 Charlotte Glennie – journalist and presenter
 Jennie Goodwin – journalist, newsreader and continuity announcer
 Patrick Gower – political presenter, interviewer and reporter
 Steve Gray – blogger and broadcaster
 Kay Gregory – journalist and former presenter
 Airini Nga Roimata Grennell – singer, pianist, broadcaster
 Jason Gunn – television personality
 Alex Gilbert - adoption advocate and presenter

H
 Oriwa Tahupotiki Haddon – Methodist minister, pharmacist, artist and broadcaster
 Richard Harman – political journalist and broadcaster
 Russell Harrison – presenter, vocalist and musician
 Leigh Hart – Comedian, radio broadcaster, television presenter and producer
 Robert Harte – actor and television presenter
 David Hartnell MNZM - gossip columnist, radio and television personality
 Claudette Hauiti – presenter, producer and politician
 Mikey Havoc – DJ, radio host and television personality
 John Hawkesby – television presenter
 Kate Hawkesby – television reporter, radio and television presenter
 Jean Emily Hay – teacher, broadcaster and early childhood educator
 Karyn Hay – radio and television presenter and author
 Sam Hayes – television reporter and presenter
 Matt Heath – radio host, actor, sports commentator
 Tau Henare – talkback host and politician
 Paul Henry – television presenter and radio personality
 Dai Henwood – comedian and television presenter
 Mark Hewlett – radio and television personality (born in Zimbabwe)
 Jim Hickey – weather presenter
 Graeme Hill – radio and television presenter
 Kim Hill – radio and television broadcaster
 Carol Hirschfeld – broadcaster
 Paul Holmes – radio and television presenter
 Alison Holst – food writer and television chef
 Hayley Holt – television presenter
 Jim Hopkins – known for his work in television, radio and theatre
 Brendan Horan – former weather presenter and politician
 Mike Hosking –  television and radio journalist and presenter
 Brooke Howard-Smith – television presenter
 John Hudson – journalist and television presenter
 Hudson and Halls – presenters of the television cookery show Hudson & Halls

I
 April Ieremia – former television host, former netball player

J
 Willie Jackson – radio and television presenter and politician
 Billy T. James – entertainer, comedian, musician and actor
 Arthur Owen Jensen – musician, music tutor and promoter, critic, broadcaster, composer
 Ian Johnstone – journalist, TV presenter and narrator
 Tony Johnson - sports broadcaster

K
 Oriini Kaipara – television journalist and presenter
 Miriama Kamo – television presenter, host and producer
 Raybon Kan – columnist, comedian
 Phil Keoghan – television presenter
 Grant Kereama – radio personality
 Graham Kerr – television cooking personality
 Phil Kerslake – leadership coach, speaker, author and television presenter
 Ruud Kleinpaste – television presenter

L
 Ken Laban – sports broadcaster (rugby)
 Mary Lambie – television presenter
 Candy Lane – Dancing with the Stars co–host
 Michael Laws – radio personality
 Bob Leahy – radio and television broadcaster
 Mark Leishman – television presenter, producer, director
 Phillip Leishman – television personality
 Shimpal Lelisi – actor and television presenter
 Vicki Lin – television presenter and actor
 Alister Murray Linton – surveyor, local politician, land officer, community leader, horticulturist and broadcaster
 Chic Littlewood – television entertainer and actor
 Richard Long – former newsreader
 Zane Lowe – BBC Radio One DJ, record producer and television presenter
 Marcus Lush – local politician, radio host and television presenter

M
 Robbie Magasiva – actor and television presenter
 Toni Marsh – weather presenter and radio news reader
 Marama Martin – news reader, continuity announcer
 Paul Martin – radio presenter
 Colin Mathura-Jeffree – television presenter and host
 Alison Mau – television presenter
 Gary McCormick – poet, radio and television personality, debater and raconteur
 Darren McDonald – television news anchor
 Hamish McKay – television presenter, sportscaster, rugby editor and sports journalist
 Anita McNaught – TVNZ and BBC World newsreader (born in England)
 Sacha McNeil – journalist and news presenter
 Mike McRoberts – television journalist and presenter
 Andrea McVeigh – sports broadcaster and former netball player
 Simon Mercep – news reporter, journalist
 Kevin Milne – television presenter
 Anika Moa – television presenter and musician
 Peter Montgomery – sports broadcaster
 Graeme Moody – sports broadcaster
 Jim Mora – television and radio presenter
 Stacey Morrison – television and radio host
 Alan Edward Mulgan – journalist, writer and broadcaster
 Jesse Mulligan – television host and radio broadcaster
 Herbert David Mullon – postal worker, broadcaster, philatelist and historian
 Lesley Murdoch – international sports broadcaster

N
 Geeling Ng – model, actress, restaurateur and television presenter
 Susie Nordqvist – news presenter
 Grant Nisbett - Sports Broadcaster

O
 Margaret Kathleen O'Brien – dance teacher, hostess, radio presenter and film director
 Tova O'Brien – television reporter, later Newshub political editor
 Bernadine Oliver-Kerby – television and radio broadcaster
 Olly Ohlson – first Māori person to host a children's television show, the After School program; radio broadcaster

P
 Bob Parker – radio, television, owner writer presenter "This Is Your Life NZ" format
 Steve Parr – television and radio presenter
 Veeshayne Patuwai – television presenter, actress, emcee and singer
 Suzanne Paul – television infomercial presenter
 Inez Isabel Maud Peacocke – teacher, novelist and broadcaster
 Arthur Fairchild Pearce – clerk, jazz specialist, broadcaster and pianist
 Amber Peebles – television presenter and former Miss New Zealand
 Lindsay Perigo – television and radio broadcasting personality
 Brian Perkins – BBC Radio Four newsreader and announcer
 Wendy Petrie – television news reader and presenter
 Brendon Pongia – television presenter and basketball player
 Antonia Prebble – actress and television presenter
 Jono Pryor – radio DJ/television Presenter
 Mike Puru – radio DJ/presenter and television presenter

Q
 Keith Quinn – radio and television sports commentator and presenter

R
 Bill Ralston – journalist, broadcaster, and media personality, active in television, radio and print
 Cherry Raymond – current affairs interviewer, game show participant
 Jason Reeves – radio broadcaster and television presenter
 Mark Richardson – radio and television presenter and former cricketer
 Matthew Ridge – television presenter, former All Black, and international rugby league captain

S
 Mark Sainsbury – current affairs television presenter
 Ric Salizzo – Sports presenter, producer
 Andrew Saville – radio and television sports presenter
 Eion Scarrow –  gardening personality, broadcaster and author
 Colin Scrimgeour – Methodist minister and broadcaster
 Haydn Sherley – radio broadcaster
Philip Sherry – television newsreader and network news anchor
 Peter ('Pete') Sinclair – television presenter
 Slave & Otis – hip hop MCs and television and radio presenters
 Aaron Slight – former professional motorcycle road racer and television presenter
 Rachel Smalley – current affairs presenter, interviewer
 Kerry Smith – actor, radio and television broadcaster
 Leighton Smith – talkback radio host
 Merv Smith – former long term breakfast radio presenter
 Barry Soper – journalist on radio and television 
 Iain Stables – radio and television personality
 Percy Ronald Stevens – mechanic and radio broadcaster
 Dougal Stevenson – television newsreader and network news anchor
 Craig Stanaway – former radio presenter and television sports reporter
 Toni Street – television presenter and sports commentator
 Jenny Suo – television presenter, newsreader, weather rapper and sports commentator

T
 Dylan Taite – television presenter and interviewer
 Jack Tame – television and radio journalist and presenter
 John Tamihere – politician, television and radio personality and political commentator
 Ian Taylor – business and former television presenter
 Ramon Te Wake – documentarian, singer-songwriter and television presenter
 Sara Tetro – model, television presenter, actress, and entrepreneur
 Hilary Timmins – television presenter
 Selwyn Toogood – television and radio presenter
 Harold Bertram Turbott – doctor, public health administrator, broadcaster and writer
 Jay Tewake - actor, singer/songwriter, model and television presenter

U
 Tui Uru – first Māori television presenter (October 1964)

V
 Nic Vallance – conservationist and television presenter
 Jordan Vandermade – television presenter
 Dayna Vawdrey – television presenter
 Tony Veitch – television presenter and radio personality

W
 Bryan Waddle – sports broadcaster
 Neil Waka – television presenter
 Arnold Wall – university professor, philologist, poet, mountaineer, botanist, writer and radio broadcaster
 Louise Wallace – television presenter and reporter
 Jeremy Wells – host of Eating Media Lunch and Seven Sharp.
 Pippa Wetzell – television host and presenter
 Guy Williams – comedian and presenter for New Zealand Today
 Peter Williams – former TVNZ news presenter, talkback host at Magic Talk
 Tim Wilson – TVNZ reporter and Newstalk ZB host
 Susan Wood – radio host and television

Y
 Lindsay Yeo – radio host
 Eric Young – radio and television presenter

References

Broadcasters
 
New Zealand
Personalities